Alishewanella solinquinati is a Gram-negative, facultative anaerobic, rod-shaped and motile bacterium from the genus of Alishewanella.

References

Bacteria described in 2014
Alteromonadales